King Oscar Fjord is a fjord in East Greenland, marking the northern border of the Scoresby Land Peninsula.

It was named by A.G. Nathorst on his 1899 expedition as Konung Oscars Fjord for Oscar II, King of Sweden from 1872 to 1907 and of Norway from 1872 until 1905.

Geography
King Oscar Fjord is a major fjord system in NE Greenland. The main fjord is 10–25 km wide, bounded by Traill Island and Geographical Society Island in the east. In the inner and northern end of the fjord lies Ella Island. The Davy Sound at the southeastern end connects with the Greenland Sea after extending for about 20 km in a NW/SE direction.

Lyell Land forms the western boundary and Scoresby Land with the Stauning Alps lies to the southwest.

The Antarctic Sound separates the Suess Land Peninsula and Ymer Island and connects with the Kaiser Franz Joseph Fjord system to the north.

Other branches of the King Oscar Fjord system are, on the western side: 
 Kempe Fjord
Dickson Fjord
Röhss Fjord
Rhedin Fjord
Narwhal Sound 
Segelsällskapet Fjord
Alpefjord
Forsblad Fjord
 Mesters Vig 
Antarctic Haven
On the eastern side:
Sofia Sound
Vega Sound
Dream Bay (Drømmebugten)

See also
List of fjords of Greenland

References

External links

On the Map of King Oscar Fjord and Kaiser Franz Josef Fjord in North-Eastern Greenland

Fjords of Greenland